The Firm is a 2009 British drama film based around football hooliganism written and directed by Nick Love. It is a remake of the original 1989 version.

Adaptation
Loosely adapted from Alan Clarke's 1989 classic TV film for Screen Two, Nick Love's film is set earlier in the 1980s; around 1984. It retells a similar story to the original, but it is told from a different character's point of view. The protagonist of this adaptation is Dom, who was a minor character in the original. Dom is a young wannabe football casual who gets drawn into the charismatic but dangerous world of the firm's top boy, Bex Bissell. A 'firm' being the name used by groups of smartly dressed hooligans, under the pretense of being supporters of a particular team, who arrange organised violence on match days with rival 'firms'.

Plot
Bex is the leader of the West Ham United football firm, that travels up and down the country to fight other firms. Dom is a normal young lad who hangs around with his mates, and one night they go to a nightclub, where his friend Tel walks into Bex. After the two share words, Bex headbutts Tel in the face. The morning after, Tel tells Dom that Bex is after them. The two then go to the local pub, the Lord Nelson, where the firm hangs out. There, Dom apologises for the two of them. Bex compliments Dom's courage, saying that he has a lot of guts to walk in and face him. Dom later finds out where Bex works and goes to visit him. They become acquaintances, visiting a sports shop where Bex purchases a pair of Adidas Munchen trainers. He then asks Dom if he wants to play in his football team. Dom accepts. Dom asks his Dad for money to buy the same pair of trainers.

Dom arrives late at the football game and is put in goal. After he saves a vital penalty, the rest of the boys begin to take a liking to him, especially Jay, who asks if he is coming to Portsmouth at the weekend. Dom agrees. Trigger, the firm's second-in-command, visits Bex at work, where he tells him that Millwall's firm and Portsmouth's firm are meeting to discuss the up-and-coming matches between the three teams. Bex walks in on the meeting to pitch his idea of the three firms coming together to form a national firm for the UEFA European Football Championship. The pitch fails, with Millwall and Portsmouth's top boys refusing to stand behind Bex in the national firm unless he and his firm can beat theirs in the upcoming meets. Saturday comes and the firm are at the station getting a train to Portsmouth. When they get there they meet the Portsmouth firm at the pub. Police arrive and try to break up the two teams. During the brawl, Dom is punched in the face but stays on his feet and punches back.

Bex visits Dom at work and tells him to not make any plans for the weekend. Dom sees Tel who criticises his tracksuit, but Dom tells him that he is part of the West Ham firm now. Dom later meets Jay, and the two go to the sports shop and steal a load of gear. Some of the firm go to Bex's house to talk about the possible national firm. Bex asks Dom if he would like to go to Europe, and Dom agrees. Bex says he has to get blooded first, which means he has to get the firm's symbol engraved on his forearm. Bex pulls out a Stanley knife and starts to engrave on Dom's arm. When the rest of the firm lick their hands and rub off the symbol that is on their arms he realises that it is a joke.

Dom goes to the Lord Nelson to meet up with the boys. Soon after arriving, he is harshly ridiculed in front of everyone by a drunken Trigger for wearing the same tracksuit as Bex. Feeling forlorn, Dom leaves the pub and doesn't to go the game. Bex then visits him at work the next day and tells him to stand up for himself, and invites him to a night club. Dom also gets invited to Crystal Palace on the weekend, but the firm end up going to Millwall to launch a surprise attack on the Millwall firm instead. Millwall fights back with weapons and largely outnumbers them. As a result, the surprise attack fails and they suffer a humiliating defeat. Bex, along with Dom and some other members of the West Ham firm, go back later and ambush a Millwall fan as he leaves the pub, beating him half to death with lead pipes. They return home only to find that their cars have been smashed up. A calling card has been placed on Bex's car saying "Congratulations, you have just met the Yeti" (the Yeti is a nickname for the Millwall firm leader).

Some of the firm express that they are not happy with Bex's reckless leadership in refusing to back down over the feud with the Yeti, and are ultimately forced by Bex to leave the firm. When Bex brings a bag full of blunt weapons to the Lord Nelson in preparation for a revenge attack on the Yeti and his firm, Dom expresses his concerns as well. Bex reacts angrily, bullying and threatening Dom and telling him that he has no choice but to stay with the firm. They go from the Lord Nelson to London Bridge station and ambush the rival firm. Dom looks on as Bex overpowers the Yeti and kicks him savagely in the head and body repeatedly as he lies on the floor. As Bex walks away, the Yeti pulls a flick knife out of his sock and stabs Bex in the stomach. Off-screen, Bex eventually succumbs to the wound.

That night, the police are seen arriving at Bex's house. His wife answers the door angrily with the baby in her arms. From the police's silence, she knows Bex has been killed and tearfully goes into denial.

In the epilogue, Dom puts on the red tracksuit that Bex told him to never wear again, and heads to the Lord Nelson one last time. He looks through the window and sees that the firm are enjoying themselves and do not appear to be mourning Bex, with Trigger now seemingly in charge. Dom sees this as his chance to get out for good. He walks away from the pub and bumps into Tel. They both walk off exchanging jokes and following their old routine before Dom joined the firm.

Cast
Paul Anderson as Bex
Calum MacNab as Dom
Daniel Mays as Yeti
Doug Allen as Trigger
Joe Jackson as Jay
Richie Campbell as Snowy
Camille Coduri as Shel
Eddie Webber as Bob
Joanne Matthews as Suzy
Billy Seymour as Terry
James Kelly as Beef
Jaf Ibrahim as Usef
Tommy Nash as Nunk
Ebony Gilbert as Justine

Reception
The Firm holds a 68% approval rating at review aggregator site Rotten Tomatoes based on the opinions of 25 critics.

Police photograph error
On 31 October 2009, it was revealed that stills from the movie were released by Scotland Yard in relation to the 2009 Upton Park riots. Police later released the following statement:

See also

Millwall F.C. and West Ham United F.C. rivalry

References

External links
 
 
 
 

2009 films
British association football films
British crime drama films
2009 crime drama films
Remakes of British films
Films directed by Nick Love
Films set in the 1980s
Millwall F.C.
British sports drama films
Vertigo Films films
Football hooliganism in the United Kingdom
West Ham United F.C.
2000s English-language films
2000s British films